Rostkowo  is a village in the administrative district of Gmina Czernice Borowe, within Przasnysz County, Masovian Voivodeship, in east-central Poland.

The village has an approximate population of 380. It is known worldwide as the place of birth of saint Stanislaus Kostka. Nowadays the church in Rostkowo is his sanctuary.

References

Rostkowo
Churches in Masovian Voivodeship